Neighborhoods in the City of Baltimore are officially divided into nine geographical regions: North, Northeast, East, Southeast, South, Southwest, West, Northwest, and Central, with each district patrolled by a respective precinct of the Baltimore Police Department. Charles Street down to Hanover Street and Ritchie Highway serve as the east-west dividing line and Eastern Avenue to Route 40 as the north-south dividing line. However, Baltimore Street is north-south dividing line for the U.S. Postal Service. It is not uncommon for locals to divide the city simply by East or West Baltimore, using Charles Street or I-83 as a dividing line.

The following is a list of major neighborhoods in the city of Baltimore, Maryland, organized by broad geographical location within the city. See below for a list of maps published by the City of Baltimore Department of Planning.

Baltimore City neighborhoods 

Listed by planning district.

Northwest

North

Northeast

East & Downtown 

 Baltimore Highlands
 Berea
 Biddle Street
 Brewers Hill
 Broadway East
 Butcher's Hill
 Canton
 Canton Industrial Area
 CARE
 Darley Park
 Downtown
 Downtown West
 Dundalk Marine Terminal
 East Baltimore Midway
 Ellwood Park/Monument
 Greenmount Cemetery
 Highlandtown
 Inner Harbor
 Johnston Square
 Madison-Eastend
 McElderry Park
 Milton-Montford
 Oliver
 Patterson Park Neighborhood
 Patterson Place
 South Clifton Park
 University of Maryland

Central

Southeast

South

Southwest

West

Maps 
 Baltimore City iMap

See also 
 Chinatown in Baltimore

References

External links 
 Baltimore's Neighborhood Statistical Areas (As of December 2016)
 Baltimore City Planning Districts (As of June 2016)
 The Baltimore Neighborhood Indicators Alliance
 Patterson Park Neighborhood Association Website
 Live Baltimore Website

Neighborhoods

Baltimore